Chernetskoye is a rural locality (a village) in Andreyevskoye Rural Settlement, Alexandrovsky District, Vladimir Oblast, Russia. The population was 13 as of 2010.

Geography 
Chernetskoye is located 31 km northeast of Alexandrov (the district's administrative centre) by road. Bolshiye Vyoski is the nearest rural locality.

References 

Rural localities in Alexandrovsky District, Vladimir Oblast